Union of OIC News Agencies (abbreviated as UNA and UNA-OIC), formerly known as the International Islamic News Agency (IINA), is a specialized organ of the  Organisation of Islamic Cooperation (OIC), is a news agency publishing in Arabic, English and French and focusing on news about the Islamic world and Islamic affairs. Its headquarters is in Jeddah, Saudi Arabia.

The agency was established in 1972, under a resolution of the Third Islamic Conference of Foreign Ministers. It is financed by OIC member states. Majid bin Abdullah Al Qasabi is chairman of the Union of OIC News Agencies (UNA-OIC) Executive Council.

See also 
Islamic Broadcasting Union

Notes

References

External links

Organisation of Islamic Cooperation specialized agencies
1972 establishments in Saudi Arabia
Organizations established in 1972
News agencies based in Saudi Arabia
Arab news agencies
Organisations based in Jeddah
Islamic media